C. maximus  may refer to:
 Cetorhinus maximus, the basking shark, the second largest living shark species
 Clianthus maximus, the "kaka beak" (or kōwhai ngutu-kākā in the Māori language), a woody legume shrub species native to New Zealand's North Island

See also
 Maximus (disambiguation)